Atrypanius conspersus is a species of longhorn beetle of the subfamily Lamiinae. It was described by Ernst Friedrich Germar in 1824 and is known from Mexico to Panama, as well as southern Amer and Bolivia. It also inhabits woodlands of Upper Amazons and capital of Brazil, Rio de Janeiro.

References

Beetles described in 1824
Beetles of South America
Arthropods of Colombia
Acanthocinini